Balance Breach are a metalcore band from Mikkeli, Finland, formed in 2015. After winning  the tuska festival competition and performing at the Tuska Open Air Metal Festival in summer 2019, the band has been under contract with Out of Line Music since January 2020. In July of the same year they released their first album Dead End Diaries.

Discography

Album 
 2020: Dead End Diaries, Out of Line

EP 
 2015: Incarceration

Singles 
 2017: Babylon
 2018: Memento
 2019: Hypocrite
 2020: Most Of This
 2020: Dead End Diaries

Music video 
 2017: Babylon

References

External links 
   Balance Breach (Facebook)
  Balance Breach - Dead End Diaries, review of the album in the German webzine metal.de

Metalcore musical groups
Finnish musical groups
Musical groups established in 2015
2015 establishments in Finland